Larini-ye Olya (also Romanized as Larīnī-ye ‘Olyā; also known as Barāftāb-e Larīnī and Larīnī) is a village in Lumar Rural District, Central District, Sirvan County, Ilam Province, Iran. At the 2006 census, its population was 226, in 45 families. The village is populated by Kurds.

References 

Populated places in Sirvan County
Kurdish settlements in Ilam Province